Thia (minor planet designation: 405 Thia) is a very large main-belt asteroid. It is classified as a C-type asteroid and is probably composed of carbonaceous material. This object was discovered by Auguste Charlois on July 23, 1895, in Nice, and was named after Theia (sometimes written Thea or Thia), a Titaness in Greek mythology.

In 2002, the asteroid was detected by radar from the Arecibo Observatory at a distance of 1.31 AU. NEOWISE data suggests the asteroid is 110 km in diameter.

On 4 May 1990 Thia passed  from Earth and will pass that close again on 29 April 2073.

Then on 2 June 2023 the asteroid will reach perihelion (closest approach to the Sun).

References

External links
 
 

Background asteroids
Thia
Thia
C-type asteroids (Tholen)
Ch-type asteroids (SMASS)
18950723